Armando Tre Re (22 June 1922 – 2003) was an Italian professional footballer who played as a defender or forward. He played for 8 seasons (218 games, 9 goals) in the Serie A for A.S. Livorno Calcio, A.S. Roma and S.S.C. Napoli. For three seasons (from 1950 to 1953) he was Roma's captain. Tre Re died in 2003.

References

1922 births
2003 deaths
Italian footballers
Serie A players
Serie B players
U.S. Massese 1919 players
U.S. Livorno 1915 players
A.S. Roma players
S.S.C. Napoli players
Association football defenders